Hossein Qoli Khan Sardar Qajar, better simply known as Hossein Khan Sardar (born ca. 1742 – died 1831) was an Iranian statesman in Qajar Iran, who was the last governor of the Erivan Khanate from 1807 to 1828. Around 1826–1828, he and Abbas Mirza, the crown prince, attempted to win back the Transcaucasian and Dagestanian possessions lost to Russia during the war of 1804-1813 which had ended with the Gulistan Treaty. However, using superior tactics and weapons developed since their defeat of Napoleon, the Tsar’s generals inflicted even greater losses on Iran.

In addition to ceding further territories, the 1828 Treaty of Turkmenchay forced Iran to pay crippling reparations. The treaty also banned Hossein Khan and his younger brother, Hasan Khan, from ever venturing north of the Aras River, the new border.

Hossein Khan belonged to the Qoyunlu branch of the Qajar clan, and was thus part of the royal Qajar dynasty. He was the son of Mohammad Khan Qajar, who had served as the governor of Erivan in the late 18th-century. Furthermore, Hossein Khan was a confidant of Fath Ali Shah, who had cemented their relationship by marrying his sister and giving one of his daughters, Shirin Jan Khanom, in marriage to Hossein Khan's son, Mohammad Qoli Khan.

According to foreign writers who visited Iran, Hossein Khan was one of the most influential and wealthy leaders in Iran with as much power as Abbas Mirza. Hossein Khan Khan did not have any members of his family as prisoners in Tehran, had the privilege to issue coins, and had the infrequent favorable circumstance of maintaining an extensive part of the income for defense intentions. He inspired commerce and established a steady government. Indeed, Armenian and Russian sources, who rarely have anything positive to assert about the Iranian khans in Transcaucasia, praise Hossein Khan for being generous, truthful, grand, diligent, and fair.

The Shah had been indebted to Hossein Khan ever since, on the death of Agha Mohammad Khan, the founder of the Qajar dynasty, Hossein Khan led an advance column of troops to Tehran to secure the capital and the throne for Fath Ali. Later, the Shah dispatched him to quell a rebellion in Khorasan province. In return for his loyalty, Hossein Khan was rewarded with the Khanate of Erevan, which he ruled until the last Russo-Persian War (1826-1828).

Hossein Khan was also granted estates encompassing some 62 villages near the city of Qazvin. Later generations of Sardars bequeathed their inheritance to religious endowments, or vaqf. The ab anbar sardar, a cavernous underground water reservoir in Qazvin, was named after Hossein Khan. Local legend has it that, at 3,000 cubic meters and 28.5 meters from base to ceiling, it took seven months to fill and its supply of water lasted for seven years. Fed by three qanats (subterranean water canals), it is the largest in Iran.

Unlike other Transcaucasian khans, Hossein Khan did not make an agreement with the Russians and accomplished to hinder their attempts for two decades. Russia’s irritation was displayed in article 14 of the Treaty of Turkmenchay (1828), which particularly removed him and his brother of the privilege to sell or trade their estates in Erevan, a privilege which was allowed to all others.

See also
 Sardar Iravani

References

Further reading
 George Bournoutian The Khanate of Erevan Under Qajar Rule, 1795-1828, Mazda Publishers, 1992.

1740s births
1831 deaths

Year of birth uncertain
Iranian governors
People of Qajar Iran
Khans of Erivan
18th-century Iranian politicians
19th-century Iranian politicians
People of the Russo-Persian Wars